This is list of Communist Party of Canada 2008 federal election candidates by riding and province.

Alberta 
Calgary East - Jason Devine
Edmonton—Mill Woods—Beaumont - Naomi Rankin

British Columbia 
Burnaby—Douglas - George Gidora
Kelowna—Lake Country - Mark Haley
Newton—North Delta - Harjit Daudharia
Vancouver Kingsway - Kimball Cariou

Manitoba 
Brandon—Souris - Lisa Gallagher
Winnipeg Centre - Darrell Rankin
Winnipeg North - Frank Komarniski

Ontario

Brampton—Springdale: Dimitrios (Jim) Kabitsis

Kabitsis was 76 years old at the time of the election, and was a retired real estate salesman.  He joined the Communist Party of Canada in 1962.  Kabitsis ran for a seat on the Toronto City Council in 1980, calling for a reduction in the cost of the Toronto Transit Commission's Metropass, a shorter term of the Metro Toronto Chairman, and the recognition of day care as a right.  His 2008 election biography also indicates that he has been a municipal candidate in Orillia.  He is a member of Fair Vote Canada, a group advocating electoral reform.

Note:  The results from 1980 are taken from the Toronto Star newspaper, 11 November 1980, A12 (146 out of 148 polls reporting).

Davenport - Miguel Figueroa
Don Valley West - Cathy Holliday
Guelph - Drew Garvie
Kitchener Centre - Martin Suter
Kitchener—Waterloo - Ramon Portillo
Ottawa West—Nepean - Alex McDonald
St. Catharines - Sam Hammond
Toronto Centre - Johan Boyden
Windsor West - Elizabeth Rowley

Quebec 
Hochelaga - Marianne Fontaine
Laurier—Sainte-Marie - Samie Page-Quirion
Mount Royal - Antonio Artuso
Westmount—Ville-Marie - Bill Sloan

References 

list of candidates from meeting at Communist Party of Canada offices on September 14, 2008

External links 
Campaign web site

Communist Party Of Canada
2008